Brian David Robertson (born 12 February 1956) is a Scottish rock guitarist, best known as a former member of Thin Lizzy and Motörhead.

Early life 
Robertson was born in Clarkston, Renfrewshire (now part of East Renfrewshire), where he was educated, attending Eastwood High School in nearby
Newton Mearns, and became a musician. He studied cello and classical piano for eight years before switching to the guitar and drums. He played in gigs around his local area with bands like Dream Police, who later evolved into the Average White Band.

Career 
In June 1974, Thin Lizzy were auditioning for two new guitarists and a try-out for Robertson was arranged. Aged 18, Robertson was taken on along with Scott Gorham on the other lead guitar. He was given the nickname "Robbo" by Phil Lynott to distinguish him from drummer Brian Downey. The two lead guitarists provided a critical part of Thin Lizzy's signature sound, referred to by critics as their "twin guitar attack". During his time in the band, Robertson was a contributing member to five studio albums released by Thin Lizzy: Nightlife (1974), Fighting (1975), Jailbreak (1976), Johnny the Fox (1976), Bad Reputation (1977) and a live album Live and Dangerous (1978).

Although frontman, bassist/lead vocalist Phil Lynott was the primary songwriter for Thin Lizzy's material, Robertson contributed a substantial share of songwriting for the band, sometimes collaborating with Lynott and the band. Nightlife and Bad Reputation were the only records that did not feature his songwriting and he performed only on selected tracks from the latter album.

In Thin Lizzy, the unusual twin harmony lead guitar sound, instigated by Robertson and Gorham, contributed much to the distinctive sound of the band and influenced subsequent bands such as Iron Maiden, Metallica, The Darkness and Velvet Revolver. Robertson's pioneering, unconventional use of the wah-wah pedal as an extension of the instrument during soloing rather than as a purely rhythmic effect provided a boost to the band as well.

Robertson struggled to deal with Lizzy's newfound fame after the release of the hit single "The Boys Are Back in Town" and the accompanying Jailbreak LP. He began drinking heavily towards the end of 1976. A further tour of the US was planned for December 1976, but it had to be cancelled when, on 23 November, Brian Robertson suffered a hand injury when trying to protect fellow Glaswegian, singer and friend Frankie Miller in a fracas at the Speakeasy Club in London. Miller had been jamming onstage with the reggae band Gonzalez, but had been drunk, offending Gonzalez guitarist Gordon Hunte. Hunte attacked Miller with a bottle in the dressing room, and Robertson intervened, suffering artery and nerve damage to his hand. Robertson subsequently broke Hunte's leg, broke the collarbone of another man, and headbutted another, before being hit on the head with a bottle, rendering him unconscious.

Robertson maintains that, contrary to reports at the time, he was not drunk and had only gone to the venue for a meal. Lynott was angry and replaced Robertson with Gary Moore for another tour of the States in January–March 1977, this time supporting Queen.

While Robertson recuperated from his injury, Lizzy flew to Toronto in May 1977 to record the Bad Reputation album with American producer Tony Visconti, with Gorham ostensibly taking all of the guitar parts. However, at Gorham's insistence, Lynott allowed Robertson to rejoin the band that June as a guest in Toronto. Gorham had left the songs "Opium Trail" and "Killer Without a Cause" without solos so that Robertson could contribute; the two also played lead together on one song, "That Woman's Gonna Break Your Heart." Robertson was fully reinstated for the remainder of 1977 and into 1978, during which the majority of the tapes for the band's well-known double LP Live and Dangerous were recorded. In July 1978 Robertson finally left the band for good, due to his drink habits once again spiraling out of control, as well as irreconcilable differences with Lynott, and was again replaced by Gary Moore, this time on an official basis.

Robertson had formed Wild Horses along with another Scot, Rainbow bassist Jimmy Bain in 1977, while recovering from his injury. After his final exit from Thin Lizzy in 1978, he returned to the band. Achieving only partial success in the UK, the band split up after releasing two albums, Wild Horses (1980) and Stand Your Ground (1981).

In 1980 Robertson was featured on the Eric Burdon album Darkness Darkness. Robertson appeared for one performance of Thin Lizzy's final tour in 1983, alongside other former guitarists. He was featured on the recording of the tour, Life, appearing on the songs "Emerald" and "The Rocker." In 1986 he recorded a cover of "Still in Love with You" as a tribute to Phil Lynott, appearing alongside Bobby Tench.

Robertson replaced "Fast" Eddie Clarke as the lead guitarist of Motörhead in May 1982. He recorded the band's 1983 King Biscuit Flower Hour sessions and Another Perfect Day, his only studio album with the group. "That felt totally uncertain," he told Classic Rock. "It only came about because I was helping out some friends and, when they asked me to join officially, I said, 'Okay, but I'm not fucking rewriting the Ace of Spades." His last appearance with Motörhead was at the Metropol in Berlin, on 11 November 1983. His resistance to playing "classic" Motörhead songs, along with a playing style and a fashion sense (he often sported a headband and leg warmers) that did not fit well with Motörhead's aggressive music and look, resulted in his departure.

After leaving Motörhead, Robertson joined Gary Barden's band Statetrooper and remained until they disbanded. In 1992 Robertson made a guest appearance with Skyclad at the Dynamo Open Air Festival, in Eindhoven, Netherlands. In 2004 he also made a guest appearance with Ash at the Oxegen festival in Ireland, playing guitar on their version of Thin Lizzy's "The Boys Are Back in Town".

He was reunited with Lizzy bandmates in August 2005 for a tribute show in memory of Phil Lynott, in a lineup fronted by Gary Moore. Robertson and Moore appeared with Brian Downey, Scott Gorham, Eric Bell and Jethro Tull bassist Jonathan Noyce. This concert and an extended interview with Robertson were released on the DVD One Night in Dublin: A Tribute to Phil Lynott.

During February 2008 Robertson returned to the studio to work on new material. He also made a guest appearances on The Bitter Twins debut album Global Panic!, which was released in 2009.

His first solo album Diamonds and Dirt, featuring Ian Haugland of Europe, Nalle Pahlsson from Treat, Leif Sundin from MSG and Liny Wood, was recorded in Stockholm at Polar Studios over a two-year period. It was produced by Robertson, Soren Lindberg and Chris Laney. The album features thirteen songs, written by Robertson and others including Phil Lynott, Frankie Miller and Jim White. It was released in Europe through Steamhammer Records in March 2011.

Personal life 

Robertson has one son with Karen Rix. They were introduced by Tommy Crossin of Rix's management team, who also worked for Lemmy and Motörhead, in 1985 at Donington festival and later started dating. They lived together at The Barbican. Their son Logan Robertson was born in London April 4, 1991. Robertson lives in Essex, England when he is not on tour or recording in Scandinavia, where he spends a lot of his working time.

Influences 
Like many British rock guitarists, Robertson was significantly influenced by earlier blues guitarists. Robertson's influences include Freddie King, Jeff Beck, Eric Clapton and Peter Green. ZZ Top's Billy Gibbons is also mentioned as a later influence.

Equipment

Guitars 

Robertson is often associated with a Black 1960 Les Paul Custom, with a white/parchment (rather than black) coloured pick guard, featured in photographs on the Live and Dangerous album and the subsequent video. However, in an interview Robertson explained that his main guitar remains his original Thin Lizzy Sunburst 1973 Les Paul Deluxe, albeit re-fretted due to wear and with 1959 vintage Gibson Seth Lover PAF humbucker pickups fitted by his guitar technician. The pickups are without the normal German-silver pick-up covers, a popular modification.

Robertson acquired his Deluxe in 1974, just after joining Thin Lizzy. It was his main guitar on all of the Lizzy studio albums. In the autumn of 1977, when he had the pickups on the Deluxe changed, he began using the Custom (photographs taken at the Tower Theater in Upper Darby, Pennsylvania, from October of that year are among the earliest-known images of Robertson using the guitar). This became his main guitar from then until the early 1980s, when he switched back to the Deluxe (he can be seen with it in some footage with Motorhead). It has been his main guitar ever since. Robertson can also be seen playing a white Fender Stratocaster with black pick-guard and a black Gibson SG in mimed footage with Lizzy. Robertson was also filmed playing a Mid 70's Travis Bean TB1000A (Easily confused with a similar guitar with a T section neck, and  headstock forking into two slight curves made by Gary Kramer) The distinctive straight-sided T-cutout in the carved headstock of the solid Reynolds 6061 aluminium alloy core that includes, headstock, neck and continues behind a thin layer of Koa wood behind bridge, which is secured directly into the ally, on Dedication  and Don't Believe A Word. 

Although associated with Marshall amplifiers (100 watt non-Master Volume Superlead heads and 25 W Celestion Greenback speakers), Robertson has been known to use Mesa Boogie (100 W Dual Rectifier head) and Soundman amplifiers. The Jailbreak album was recorded using a Carlsbro combo. Robertson's original wah-pedal is a UK made Colorsound although he sometimes used a Cry Baby wah wah in the 1990s and a borrowed Vox Wah in the "Still in Love with Blues" video (which the host, Stuart Bull, cut the rubber feet off of, much to the dismay of Brian). 

Robertson's use of the WEM Copicat tape echo unit was later replaced by a modern rack mounted digital delay unit. He used a Black Les Paul custom and mentions he experimented with "Boss Analog Chorus Delay, an MXR Pitch Transposer, Yamaha analogue delays, and MXR 32 band Graphic EQ" during his Motörhead days.

Record producer Tony Visconti mentioned that for "Killer Without A Cause," featured on the Bad Reputation album: ... Robertson plays guitar through the strange talk box, the simple gizmo that Peter Frampton made famous on his successful live album."

On his VHS video "Still in Love with the Blues" Robertson is pictured with a vintage red Les Paul guitar, unusually equipped with soapbar pickups and a trapeze bridge, although it does not feature on the video itself. Robertson's Facebook page features more information on this instrument: purchased by Thin Lizzy's manager in 1973, the guitar has an unusually lightweight body as it was built by Les Paul himself for his then-wife, guitarist Mary Ford.

Guitar Rig & Signal Flow 
A detailed gear diagram of Robertson's 1974 Thin Lizzy guitar rig is documented.

Discography

Solo 
 Diamonds and Dirt (2011)

With Thin Lizzy 
Nightlife (1974)
Fighting (1975)
Jailbreak (1976)
Johnny the Fox (1976)
Bad Reputation (1977)
Live and Dangerous (1978)
Life (1983)

With Wild Horses 
Wild Horses (1980)
Stand Your Ground (1981)

With Motörhead 
Another Perfect Day (1983)
Live 83 – Sheffield 9 June 1983 (1983)
Live At Manchester 10 June 1983 (1983)
The Birthday Party (1990)

Other albums 
Pat Travers – Makin' Magic (1977)
Peter French – Ducks in Flight (1978)
Roy Sundholm – The Chinese Method (1979)
Philip Lynott Solo in Soho (1980)
Zaine Griff – Ashes and Diamonds (1980)
Eric Burdon – Darkness Darkness (1980)
Frankie Miller – Dancing in the Rain (1986)
Balaam and the Angel – Live Free or Die (1988)
Mona Liza Overdrive – Vive La Ka Bum (1989)
Skyclad – Tracks from the Wilderness EP (1992)
Shane MacGowan and The Popes – The Snake (1994)
The Clan – That's All... EP (1995)
Shane MacGowan and The Popes – Christmas Party EP (1996)
Various Artists – Thousand Days of Yesterdays – A Tribute to Captain Beyond (1999)
Lotus – A Taster for the Big One (1999)
Five Fifteen – Silver Machine (2000)
Lotus – Quartet Conspiracy (2000)
Dogface – Unleashed (2001)
Steve Ellis – Last Angry Man (2001)
Meldrum – Loaded Mental Cannon (2001)
Five Fifteen – The Man Who Sold Himself (2004)
The Bitter Twins – Global Panic! (2009)

Interviews on DVDs 
 Gary Moore and Friends: One Night in Dublin – A Tribute to Phil Lynott (2005)
 Motorhead Videobiography – double DVD (2007)
 Motorhead Overkill – double DVD (2008)
 "Thin Lizzy Live and Dangerous" – DVD (2007)

Interviews on VHS video 
 Still in Love with the Blues a JamTrax guitar tuition video/masterclass featuring Robertson with Stuart Bull. The title is a play on Robertson's signature Thin Lizzy track, "Still in Love with You". The video is also available on YouTube.

References

External links 
 Brian Robertson's Thin Lizzy era rig
 Motörhead official website

Living people
Lead guitarists
1956 births
People from Clarkston, East Renfrewshire
Motörhead members
Scottish rock guitarists
Scottish male guitarists
Scottish heavy metal guitarists
Thin Lizzy members
Wild Horses (British band) members
People educated at Eastwood High School, Newton Mearns